The Giant is a proposed concept that would be the world's tallest moving statue. Inspired by Gulliver's Travels, the work was spearheaded by Paddy Dunning with support from the Berlin-based architecture studio Dan Pearlman and Enterprise Ireland.

The sculpture is designed to sing, speak, and move its arms and head. The Giant Company hopes to display the statue in 21 cities in 2021. Selected cities have reportedly included Phoenix, Arizona. Others which have expressed interest include Belfast, Berlin, Dubai, Dublin, Las Vegas, London, New York, and Singapore.

See also

 2021 in art
 List of tallest statues

References

External links
 The Giant Company
  (BBC Click, July 7, 2021)
 Get a first look at ‘The Giant’ statue coming to 21 cities across the globe (May 11, 2021), Today.com

Statues